Craig Culpan (born May 17, 1982 in Vancouver, British Columbia and raised in Auckland, New Zealand) was a Canadian rugby union player. Culpan was a member of the Canadian national team.

Notes

1982 births
Living people
Canadian rugby union players
Canadian emigrants to New Zealand
Sportspeople from Vancouver
Canada international rugby union players
Rugby union centres